Overend is a surname. Notable people with the surname include:

William Heysham Overend (5 October 185118 March 1898), British marine artist and book illustrator
Best Overend (1909–1977), Australian architect
Jonathan Overend, English journalist
Jonathan Magri Overend (born 1970), Maltese footballer
Ned Overend (born 1955), American cyclist
Robert Overend (1930–2017), Northern Ireland politician
Sandra Overend (born 1973), Northern Ireland politician